Seo Dong-hyeon (born June 5, 1985 in Hongcheon) is a Korean football player for K3 League club Gyeongju KHNP. His nickname is 'Rainmaker'.

Early life
Seo Dong-hyeon was born in Gangwon-do, South Korea on June 5, 1985. He lived and went to school in Yeonpyeong, South Korea before moving to Seoul and attending Konkuk University. He was picked by the Suwon Samsung Bluewings in the first round of the 2005 K-League draft.

Career

Club career
In his first year with the Suwon Samsung Bluewings in 2006, Seo Dong-hyeon made 26 appearances and scored 2 goals. Most of his appearances came as a substitute but he was able to impress Suwon Samsung Bluewings manager Cha Bum-Kun enough to say that the youngster "has a long future at this club".

However, in 2007 he made it to the pitch only 12 times this year due toan ankle injury that took 6 months to heal. In his few appearances, he was able to net 4 goals and continued to show great improvement.

2008 is the year that will be known as the "Seo Dong-hyeon Coming Out Party". With the Suwon Samsung Bluewings in desperate need of a striker to bring in goals, Seo has done his best to calm those cries. So far this year, he has 11 goals in 21 appearances and the season is only half over.

In July 2010, he moved to Gangwon FC.

In November 2011, he was traded from Gangwon to Jeju United for forward Kim Eun-Jung.

On 21 July 2005, he scored his first career hat-trick in a 6–0 victory over Chunnam.

International career
He made his debut for the South Korea national football team in a friendly at home to Jordan on 5 September 2008, coming on for the final 15 minutes and going close to scoring in added time.

Honours
With the strong play of Seo Dong-hyeon coinciding with the first year of the Suwon Samsung Bluewings Foreign Supporters organization, the group's first official song is a tribute to Seo Dong-hyeon. Sung in South Korean, "Seo Dong-hyeon Football Genius" has been extremely popular and original creator Iain Pearce is working on a follow-up tribute to Seo Dong-hyeon.

Club career statistics

References

External links
 
 National Team Player Record 
 FIFA Player Statistics
 

1985 births
Living people
Association football forwards
South Korean footballers
South Korea international footballers
Suwon Samsung Bluewings players
Gangwon FC players
Jeju United FC players
Ansan Mugunghwa FC players
Daejeon Hana Citizen FC players
Suwon FC players
Seo Dong-hyeon
K League 1 players
K League 2 players
Seo Dong-hyeon
Konkuk University alumni
Seo Dong-hyeon
Sportspeople from Gangwon Province, South Korea